The women's pursuit competition of the Biathlon World Championships 2011 was held on March 6, 2011 at 16:30 local time. The best 60 athletes from the sprint participated.

Results

See also
2011 IPC Biathlon and Cross-Country Skiing World Championships – Women's pursuit

References

Biathlon World Championships 2011
2011 in Russian women's sport